Buckeye is an unincorporated community in Salamonie Township, Huntington County, Indiana.

History
Buckeye had its start in the year 1879 by the building of the railroad through that territory. A post office was established at Buckeye in 1879, and remained in operation until it was discontinued in 1920.

Geography

References

Unincorporated communities in Huntington County, Indiana
Unincorporated communities in Indiana